Lestes pallidus is a species of damselfly in the family Lestidae, the spreadwings. Its common names include pallid spreadwing and pale spreadwing. It is native to Africa, where it is widespread. It lives around pools and streams.

References

External links

 Lestes pallidus on African Dragonflies and Damselflies Online

P
Odonata of Africa
Insects described in 1842
Taxonomy articles created by Polbot